Michael Howard Anderson (born February 6, 1949) is a former American football player.

Playing career
Anderson graduated from Robert E. Lee High School in Baton Rouge, Louisiana, in 1967 and then attended Louisiana State University in the same city.  He played college football for the LSU Tigers from 1967 to 1970 and was a consensus All-American linebacker in 1970.

Post-playing career
Anderson later operated restaurants in Baton Rouge and New Orleans called Mike Anderson's Seafood. In 2014, he sued the NCAA and Riddell Inc., a helmet manufacturer, seeking compensation for head injuries he sustained while playing college football.  He alleged that the defendants failed to protect players from, or to inform them adequately about, brain injuries.

References

1949 births
Living people
All-American college football players
American football linebackers
LSU Tigers football players
Players of American football from Louisiana